Jorge Gómez Baillo (born 19 April 1959), is an Argentine chess International Master (IM) (1986), Argentine Chess Championship winner (1983), Chess Olympiad individual gold medalist (1988).

Biography
Jorge Gómez Baillo was one of Argentina's leading chess players in the 1980s. Multiple medalist of the Argentine Chess Championships:
 In 1982, shared 1st-4th place, but remained in 3rd place after the extra tournament;
 In 1983, shared 1st-2nd place and won an additional match for the title of champion;
 In 1985, shared 3rd-4th place;
 In 1988, ranked 2nd.

Jorge Gómez Baillo played for Argentina in the Chess Olympiads:
 In 1982, at second reserve board in the 25th Chess Olympiad in Lucerne (+1, =1, -2),
 In 1984, at third board in the 26th Chess Olympiad in Thessaloniki (+1, =5, -3),
 In 1988, at second reserve board in the 28th Chess Olympiad in Thessaloniki (+5, =2, -0) and won individual gold medal,
 In 1990, at fourth board in the 29th Chess Olympiad in Novi Sad (+4, =7, -0).

Jorge Gómez Baillo played for Argentina in the World Team Chess Championship:
 In 1985, at first reserve board in the 1st World Team Chess Championship in Lucerne (+0, =3, -1).

Jorge Gómez Baillo played for Argentina in the Pan American Team Chess Championship:
 In 1987, at third board in the 3rd Pan American Team Chess Championship in Junín (+2, =1, -2) and won team bronze and individual silver medals.

Jorge Gómez Baillo played for Argentina in the South American Team Chess Championship:
 In 1989, at second board in the 1st South American Team Chess Championship in Mar del Plata (+1, =1, -0) and won team and individual gold medals.

Jorge Gómez Baillo played for Argentina in the World Youth U26 Team Chess Championships:
 In 1981, at third board in the 3rd World Youth U26 Team Chess Championship in Graz (+2, =1, -4),
 In 1983, at first board in the 4th World Youth U26 Team Chess Championship in Chicago (+2, =3, -3).

In 1986, he was awarded the FIDE International Master (IM) title.

References

External links

Jorge Gómez Baillo chess games at 365chess.com

1959 births
Living people
Argentine chess players
Chess International Masters
Chess Olympiad competitors